Condica punctifera is a moth of the family Noctuidae first described by Francis Walker in 1857. It is found in southern Florida and on the Bahamas, Cuba, Jamaica, Hispaniola and Puerto Rico.

The wingspan is 27 mm. Adults are brown with a large reniform spot which is often accented with gray white in the lower half. There is also a black basal dash. The hindwings are suffused with black brown.

Taxonomy
The species was incorrectly treated as a synonym of Condica concisa for some time.

References

Moths described in 1857
Condicinae